The Norwegian Union of Electricians and Power Station Officials (NEKF) was a trade union representing workers in jobs relating to electricity, in Norway.

The union was founded on 18 July 1918 as the Norwegian Electricians' Union, and became the NEKF in 1922.  It affiliated to the Norwegian Confederation of Trade Unions, and by 1924, it had 1,466 members.  This grew to 12,152 members in 1963.  On 1 January 1999, it merged with the Norwegian Telecommunication and Data Workers' Union, to form the Electrician and IT Workers' Union.

Presidents
1918: Oskar Marius Haugen
1938: Andreas Torp
1958: Erling Johansen
1970s: Gunnar Grimnes
1990s: Anders Kristoffersen

References

Electricians' trade unions
Trade unions established in 1918
Trade unions disestablished in 1999
Defunct trade unions of Norway